Park Cha-jeong (May 8, 1910 – May 27, 1944) was a Korean independence activist and the second wife of Kim Won-bong. Her assumed names were Yim Cheol-ae (임철애, 林哲愛) and Yim Cheol-san (임철산, 林哲山).

Park was born in Busan. Her father committed suicide fighting Japan, and her family were independence activists. In 1930, she went to China and worked in Beijing to rebuild the Communist Party of Korea. She married Kim Won-bong in 1931. In 1939 she was injured in Jiangxi and died at Chongqing in 1944. She was buried in Miryang, where Kim Won-bong was born. In 1995, she was posthumously awarded the Order of Merit for National Foundation. Her statue is located in Busan.

See also 
Anarchism in Korea

1909 births
1944 deaths
Korean independence activists
Communist Party of Korea politicians
Korean women in politics
Kim Won-bong
Recipients of the Order of Merit for National Foundation